Sisurcana polychondra is a species of moth of the family Tortricidae. It is found in Ecuador (Morona Santiago Province and Napo Province).

References

Moths described in 2004
Sisurcana
Moths of South America
Taxa named by Józef Razowski